Take, Take, Take may refer to:

"Take, Take, Take", song by Missing Foundation from the album Go into Exile (1992) 
"Take, Take, Take", song by Killing Joke from Ha (Killing Joke album)
"Take, Take, Take", song by The White Stripes from Get Behind Me Satan
"Take, Take, Take", song by This Condition from Sessions (This Condition EP)
"Take, Take, Take", song by The Helio Sequence from Young Effectuals (2001)
"Take, Take, Take", song by Hot Leg from Red Light Fever (Hot Leg album) (2009)
"Take, Take, Take", an unreleased song by Imagine Dragons (2009)